Chariton Township is an inactive township in Howard County, in the U.S. state of Missouri.

Chariton Township was erected in 1821.

References

Townships in Missouri
Townships in Howard County, Missouri